Trevaia Williams-Davis (née Williams; born September 7, 1968) is an American sprinter and hurdler, who specialized in the 400-meter dash. She was a silver medalist in the 4 × 400 m relay at the 1993 IAAF World Indoor Championships, along with her teammates Terri Dendy, Dyan Webber, and Natasha Kaiser-Brown. She was the bronze medalist in the 400 m hurdles at the 1993 Summer Universiade. She married Terril Davis, another sprinter.  They went on to have two sons, Isaac and Jayden. She exposed her sons to the sport through her work. For example, while coaching a track club at Eduprize, a charter school in Queen Creek, Arizona, Trevaia supported her sons to train with the other kids.

References 

American female sprinters
World Athletics Indoor Championships medalists
1968 births
Living people
21st-century American women
Universiade medalists in athletics (track and field)
Universiade bronze medalists for the United States